Obeid is one romanization of a common Arabic given name and surname.

It may refer to:

Given name
 Obeid bin Said bin Rashid, first Ruler of Dubai under the Al Bu Falasah, ruling for three years prior to his death in 1836
 Obeid Al-Dosari (born 1975), Saudi Arabian football player

Middle name
Ahmed Obeid bin Daghr (born 1952), Yemeni politician and former Prime Minister of Yemen 2016 to 2018
Mohammed Obeid Al-Salhi (born 1986), Saudi middle distance runner 
Mustafa Osman Obeid Salim, Sudanese Army officer and Chief of Staff

Surname
 Abdel Karim Obeid, Lebanese Shia Sheikh and Imam
 Amir Obeid, known professionally as Amir Obè, American rapper, singer, songwriter, and record producer
 Atef Obeid (1932–2014), Egyptian politician
 Eddie Obeid (born 1943), Australian politician
 Jean Obeid (born 1939), Lebanese politician, government minister and journalist
 Jorge Obeid (1947–2014), Argentine politician, Governor of Santa Fe
 Lina M. Obeid (1955-2019), American medical researcher
 Reem Obeid, Lebanese footballer
 Suleiman Obeid (born 1984), Palestinian footballer

See also
Al-Ubaid (disambiguation), for links to the same name in various other romanizations
El-Obeid, city in Sudan
 Ubaydul Haq (disambiguation) and variants